Miroslav Soukup (born 13 November 1965) is a Czech football manager and former footballer. He is the current manager of Yemen national football team. Previously, he was in charge of the Iraq national Olympic team.

Managerial career
He was one of the managers leading successful Czech Republic national under-20 football team, runners-up at the 2007 FIFA U-20 World Cup held in Canada and was also manager of bronze medal Czech Republic national under-19 football team at the 2006 UEFA European Under-19 Football Championship. He was also manager of Egypt national under-20 football team.

He became the coach of 1. FC Slovácko, replacing Josef Mazura on 18 April 2010. After losing the opening three games of the 2012–13 Gambrinus liga, Soukup was relieved of his duties. Soukup was not out of football for long, as he took over at Gambrinus liga side SK Dynamo České Budějovice in September 2012 following the dismissal of František Cipro. He didn't last long as he was sacked in the winter break of the 2012–13 season after a 6–1 friendly match loss to Mladá Boleslav in February 2013. On 13 May 2014 he was confirmed as the head coach of Yemen national football team. On 27 July 2016, Soukup was appointed as the new manager of the Bahrain national football team. Under his guidance, Bahrain progressed to the knockout stage for the first time since 2004, and it was considered as a success. Despite this, Soukup left the position after the Asian Cup.
Shortly after he was rehired by Yemen ahead of the Persian Gulf cup

References

1965 births
Living people
Czech footballers
Czechoslovak footballers
Czech football managers
Czech expatriate football managers
Czech First League managers
1. FC Slovácko managers
SK Dynamo České Budějovice managers
Yemen national football team managers
Bahrain national football team managers
People from Prachatice
Association football midfielders
2019 AFC Asian Cup managers
Czech expatriate sportspeople in Egypt
Czech expatriate sportspeople in Yemen
Czech expatriate sportspeople in Iraq
Czech expatriate sportspeople in Bahrain
Expatriate football managers in Yemen
Expatriate football managers in Iraq
Expatriate football managers in Bahrain
Expatriate football managers in Egypt
Sportspeople from the South Bohemian Region